David Jonathon Shulkin (born July 22, 1959) is an American physician and former government official. In 2017, Shulkin became the ninth United States Secretary of Veterans Affairs and served under President Donald Trump. He was the Under Secretary of Veterans Affairs for Health from 2015 until 2017, appointed by President Barack Obama. On March 28, 2018, President Trump dismissed Shulkin from his position by tweet, and announced that Physician to the President Ronny Jackson would be nominated as Shulkin's successor, although Jackson's nomination was withdrawn on April 26, 2018, after allegations surfaced of misconduct and mismanagement while serving in the White House. He was succeeded by Under Secretary of Defense Robert Wilkie.

Early life
David Shulkin was born at the Fort Sheridan U.S. Army base in Highland Park, Illinois, to Mark Weiss Shulkin and Sonya Lee (née Edelman), where his father was an Army psychiatrist. Both of his grandfathers fought in World War I. He received a BA from Hampshire College in 1982, and an MD degree from Medical College of Pennsylvania (which has since merged into Drexel University) in 1986; he then did his medical internship at Yale School of Medicine, and his residency and fellowship in General Medicine at the University of Pittsburgh Presbyterian Medical Center. He was a Robert Wood Johnson Foundation Clinical Scholar at the University of Pennsylvania.

Career
Shulkin specialized in health care management. He has been described as one of the "high priests" of patient centered care. Shulkin was the President and chief executive officer of Beth Israel Medical Center in New York City. While there, Shulkin would walk the wards after midnight after he discovered the night shift was providing a lower quality of care. He also was president of Morristown Medical Center and as vice president of Atlantic Health System Accountable Care Organization.

He was the first Chief Medical Officer of the University of Pennsylvania Hospital and later at the University of Pennsylvania Health System, Temple University Hospital, and the Medical College of Pennsylvania Hospital.

His other academic positions have included Chairman of Medicine and Vice Dean at Drexel University College of Medicine, and Professor of Medicine at Albert Einstein College of Medicine. Shulkin has been the editor of Journal of Clinical Outcomes Management  and Hospital Physician, and has been on the editorial boards of several journals, including Journal of the American Medical Association. He founded and served as the chairman and CEO of DoctorQuality, Inc., a consumer-oriented information service.

Shulkin has written several peer-reviewed journal articles and other professional publications. In 1999, Shulkin started a pay for performance company called DoctorQuality, which ultimately failed.

Veterans Affairs
In 2015, Shulkin left the private sector when he was named by President Barack Obama as Under Secretary of Veterans Affairs for Health in the United States Department of Veterans Affairs (VA). When his staff told him it would take ten months to organize a summit on combat veteran suicides, Shulkin told them that during the wait 6,000 veterans would die and to get it done in one month, which they then did.

On January 11, 2017, Shulkin was nominated by President-elect Donald Trump as United States Secretary of Veterans Affairs. Trump, who had first considered five others, nominated Shulkin after a recommendation by Ambassador David M. Friedman. On February 13, 2017, the United States Senate unanimously confirmed Shulkin as the U.S. Secretary of Veterans Affairs in a 100–0 vote, making him the only cabinet nominee by President Trump to have unanimous consent. He was the first non-veteran to hold the position. In this position, Shulkin oversaw the government's second-largest agency, with over 350,000 employees and 1,700 facilities. Shulkin hoped to increase reliance on private health care for routine procedures, like hearing aids, so the department could focus on its core mission of caring for the wounded.

For President Trump's address to a joint session of Congress on February 28, 2017, Shulkin was the designated survivor in the line of succession of the president.

In April 2017, Shulkin had every VA hospital and clinic begin publicly posting quality data and wait times. He wanted to provide those with a less than honorable military discharge with free mental health care.

In May 2017, behind closed doors, Shulkin asked his VA healthcare directors to get rid of in-house optometry and audiology services to veterans—instead farming out those services to private community care.

In early July 2017, Shulkin announced that any settlement with an employee will require the approval of the undersecretary, assistant secretary or equivalent senior-level official. This effectively stopped all settlements. Lawyer Debra D'Agostino said that this will increase litigation against the VA and taxpayers will be paying for the VA's defense of itself and any illegal actions of its leadership. D'Agostino also said that federal agencies found liable for discrimination or whistleblower retaliation are not penalized as severely as private companies as compensatory damages are limited and there are no punitive damages available.

On March 28, 2018, Trump announced on Twitter that Shulkin had been fired and would be replaced by appointee Robert Wilkie in the interim. Trump also announced that Rear Admiral Ronny Jackson would be nominated to replace Shulkin.

Privatization of VA healthcare
Following his dismissal in March 2018, Shulkin highlighted the political pressure from the Trump White House to dismantle VA healthcare and send veterans to the private sector. In a New York Times editorial, Shulkin warned that "privatization is a political issue aimed at rewarding select people and companies with profits, even if it undermines care for veterans." Much of the political push to privatize VA healthcare comes from the political advocacy group Concerned Veterans of America (CVA), which is backed by Charles and David Koch. Privatization of VA healthcare is overwhelmingly opposed by veterans and veteran service organizations (VSO). Political aides assigned to VA, including John Ullyot, Camilo J. Sandoval and Jake Leinenkugel, battled with Shulkin over the issue and advocated for his removal in an effort to coerce him to support privatization. Shulkin's removal as head of the VA has renewed concerns among veterans that the Trump administration will privatize VA healthcare.

European trip controversy
In September 2017, The Washington Post reported that Shulkin spent nearly half his time on a July 2017 international trip to Europe—which was paid for by taxpayers—sightseeing and shopping with his wife, Merle Bari. Shulkin later told The Washington Post that he did "nothing inappropriate" on the trip, that the trip was taken primarily to attend a Five Eyes conference, and that personal visits to "various historic and other sites in London and in Denmark" were done "on nights, on weekends, the day before the conference started" and were "paid for by me".

In February 2017
, a report by Michael J. Missal, the Inspector General of Veterans Affairs, concluded that Shulkin's staff had misled both the agency's ethics officials and the public about the nature of the eleven-day trip. The report said that Shulkin's chief of staff, Vivieca Wright Simpson, had altered emails and had made false statements to make it look like Shulkin was receiving a Danish government award to justify his wife accompanying him on the taxpayer-funded trip. The Veterans Administration had paid over $4,300 for her airfare. The Inspector General said that the overall expense for the trip was at least $122,334. The report also said that Shulkin had inappropriately accepted tickets to Wimbledon worth thousands of dollars and had directed an aide to act as a "personal travel concierge" for the trip. The Inspector General referred his concerns about the potential criminality of the actions undertaken by Shulkin's chief of staff to the Department of Justice, which declined to prosecute.

In an interview with National Public Radio the day after his dismissal, Shulkin said that the Secretary of Veterans Affairs has been invited to this conference for decades and that he gave three different lectures at this particular conference. Shulkin reiterated that the personal trips were taken outside the time of the conference was held. He said that the only expense incurred by his wife that was paid by the federal government was for her economy class airfare, which had been approved in advance. When the airfare expense was later questioned, Shulkin said he reimbursed the federal government for the cost. He also said that prior to his dismissal the Trump Administration had forbidden him from speaking to the media to respond to the accusations publicly. The VA Inspector General report found no evidence that Shulkin was ever aware of the actions alleged to have been taken by the Chief of Staff.  Furthermore, an internal VA Committee that reviewed the matter concluded that "there was no indication of fraud, misrepresentation or bad faith", on the part of Shulkin.

Personal life
Shulkin is married to Merle Bari, a dermatologist. They have two children, Daniel and Jennifer. His daughter, Jennifer, won a gold medal in squash at the 2009 Maccabiah Games. Shulkin is Jewish.

Published works
 
 Shulkin, David J., M.D. (2008). Questions Patients Need to Ask: Getting the Best Healthcare. Xlibris, Corp. .
Shulkin, David J., M.D. (2019). It Shouldn't Be This Hard to Serve Your Country: Our Broken Government and the Plight of Veterans. PublicAffairs. .

Awards and honors
 Senior Fellow at the Leonard Davis Institute in Health Economics at the University of Pennsylvania.
 Robert Wood Johnson Foundation Clinical Scholar at the University of Pennsylvania.
 National Health Policy Fellow, U.S. Senate Committee on Aging
 Named one of the country's top Health care leaders for the next century by Modern Healthcare,
 Named One of the Hundred Most Powerful in Healthcare (ranked #86) by Modern Healthcare (2008).

References

Further reading
 "Recognizing Quality"- Disease Management Protocols at Core of A Pennsylvania Hospital's Award Winning Approach" – Modern Healthcare, February 2, 1998
 "What Quality Measurements Miss" – Managed Care Interface, March 1997.
 "Ten Ways Technology Can Make You Money" – Time magazine Guide to Personal Technology, April 1998

External links

 Secretary of Veterans Affairs David Shulkin
 Official website
 Academic Curriculum Vitae

|-

|-

1959 births
Physicians from Pennsylvania
Hampshire College alumni
Jewish American members of the Cabinet of the United States
Drexel University alumni
Living people
Obama administration personnel
People from Montgomery County, Pennsylvania
People from Highland Park, Illinois
Trump administration cabinet members
United States Secretaries of Veterans Affairs
American healthcare managers